Jahan Bini (also Romanized as Jahān Bīnī; also known as Jahān Bīn) is a village in Shirang Rural District, Kamalan District, Aliabad County, Golestan Province, Iran. At the 2006 census, its population was 493, in 116 families.

References 

Populated places in Aliabad County